Kunwar Sone Singh Ponwar also knowns as Kunwar Sone Shah, died in 1816, ruled on Chhatarpur dynasty as Raja between 1785 and 1816.

Notes

18th-century Indian monarchs
19th-century Indian monarchs
History of Madhya Pradesh